Stanisław Zieliński (26 July 1912 – September 1939) was a Polish cyclist. He competed in the individual and team road race events at the 1936 Summer Olympics. He disappeared while attempting to flee Warsaw during the Invasion of Poland.

See also
 List of people who disappeared

References

External links
 

1912 births
1939 deaths
Polish male cyclists
Olympic cyclists of Poland
Cyclists at the 1936 Summer Olympics
Cyclists from Warsaw
Polish military personnel killed in World War II
Missing in action of World War II